Erynniopsis is a genus of flies in the family Tachinidae.

Species
Erynniopsis antennata (Rondani, 1861)

References

Diptera of Europe
Diptera of North America
Exoristinae
Tachinidae genera
Taxa named by Charles Henry Tyler Townsend